Diran Alexanian (April 12, 1881, Constantinople – 1954, Chamonix, France) was an Armenian cello teacher and one of the world's greatest virtuoso cellists.

Early life
He started his studies in music under the supervision of his maternal uncle Hovannes Aznavour. He continued studying the cello with Guatelli, an Italian musician based in Constantinople. At age 15, in 1895, despite his parents' objections, moved to Germany and became a pupil of  Friedrich Grützmacher at the Dresden Conservatory in Leipzig,and through him, meets violinist Joseph Joachim as well as Johannes Brahms and begins to play in his orchestra . At a young age he was an accomplished cellist, performing at age seventeen the solo part of Richard Strauss's Don Quixote.

At age twenty, Alexanian settled in Paris, where he met Pablo Casals. Casals had seen Alexanian perform, and noticed that Alexanian's fingering was in line with his new way of playing the cello. They got to know one another, finding they had similar views on general technique and interpretation of music.

There, he and Casals put their revolutionary ideas into practice. Students from around the world came to study with him at this time, including Gabriel Cusson, Maurice Eisenberg, Antonio Janigro, Gregor Piatigorsky, Hidayat Inayat Khan, Pierre Fournier, Rodica Sutzu, and Emmanuel Feuermann. During his tenure at the school, Alexanian published his 1922 book on cello technique, Traite Theorique et Pratique du Violoncelle, as well as his famous edition of the Bach Suites in 1929. In a concert at the École 1933 he premiered Frederick Jacobi's Concerto (Three Psalms) for Cello and Orchestra (which Jacobi had dedicated to Alexanian), under conductor Alfred Cortot.

Alexanian abandoned his position at the École in 1937, and moved to the United States. There he taught both at the Peabody Institute in Baltimore, and the Manhattan School of Music in New York City. There his students included Bernard Greenhouse, David Soyer, George Ricci, Raya Garbousova, David Wells, and Mischa Schneider.

Composing
Diran Alexanian's first attempts at composing during the course of his studies in Germany were his choral works written for the choir of the Protestant church. As a composer, he is best known for writing a number of transcripts based on ancient songs - sacred or profane. His «Little Armenian Suite» (1919) composed for chamber orchestra, includes instrumental versions of the liturgical piece «Khorurt khorin» and profane chants «Oror», «Alaguiaz» and «Hovarek» («The Deep Mystery», «Lullaby», «Alaguiaz Mountain» and «Given the Freshness»). 
This Suite was performed for the first time at a gala in honor of the famous Armenian writer and journalist Arshak Chobanian at Paris's Gaveau concert hall.
There are also well-known arrangements of popular pieces for strings, especially for the cello. 
His works include «Two Poems», by Camille Mauclair, for voice and piano, 1919, Paris, Mathot edition,
«Soir, les roses dans le coupe», after Albert Samain's poem, for voice and piano, 1918, Paris, Ricordi edition,
Qintet for piano and strings,
Two pieces, «Aria» and «Pastoral» for cello and piano from the «Christmas oratorio» by J.S. Bach, 1904, Paris,
«Lullaby»  for cello and piano, 1923, Paris.

Death
Diran Alexanian died in France in 1954, at the age of 73, during his European tour.

References

External links
 
  

1881 births
1954 deaths
Armenian cellists
Musicians from the Ottoman Empire
Musicians from Istanbul
French cellists
French music educators
American cellists
Cello pedagogues
Academic staff of the École Normale de Musique de Paris
Peabody Institute faculty
Manhattan School of Music faculty
Armenians from the Ottoman Empire
Emigrants from the Ottoman Empire to France
French emigrants to the United States
20th-century cellists